Nilash (also Romanized as Nīlāsh; also known as Nīlāzh) is a village in Shanderman Rural District, Shanderman District, Masal County, Gilan Province, Iran. At the 2006 census, its population was 684, in 171 families.

References 

Populated places in Masal County